Richard A. Lamby (born May 3, 1955) is an American former professional ice hockey defenseman who played 22 National Hockey League regular season games with the St. Louis Blues in 1978-80 but spent most of his career in the minor leagues. As an amateur he played for the US team in the 1976 Winter Olympics as well as the Salem State University and Boston University men's hockey team in the early 1970s. He also represented the United States in the 1975 and 1978 Ice Hockey World Championship tournaments.

Awards and honors

References

External links

Dick Lamby @ hockeydraftcentral.com

1955 births
Living people
American men's ice hockey defensemen
Ice hockey players at the 1976 Winter Olympics
New England Whalers draft picks
Olympic ice hockey players of the United States
People from Auburn, Massachusetts
Ice hockey players from Massachusetts
St. Louis Blues draft picks
St. Louis Blues players
Dallas Black Hawks players
Muskegon Mohawks players
Boston University Terriers men's ice hockey players
NCAA men's ice hockey national champions
Sportspeople from Worcester County, Massachusetts